Angel, full name Ange-Jean-Robert Eustache Angel, (15 October 1813 – 14 May 1861) was a 19th-century French playwright.

A collaborator to  the theatrical headings of the Cabinet de lecture, the France maritime and the Moniteur des théâtres, his plays were presented ont the most famous Parisian stages of his time including the Théâtre du Palais-Royal, the Théâtre de l'Ambigu-Comique, the Théâtre de la Porte Saint-Antoine, and the Gymnase des enfants.

Works 

1832: Les Brasseurs du faubourg, comédie en vaudeville in 1 act
1833: Le Beau Jour, ou Une coutume flamande, vaudeville in 1 act
1835: Jeune Fille et Jeune Fleur, ou les Deux Pâquerettes, comédie-vaudeville in 1 act
1836: Julia, ou les Dangers d'un bon mot, comédie-vaudeville in 2 acts, with Xavier Veyrat
1836: Un dernier jour de vacances, tableau anecdotique in 1 act, mingled with couplets
1837: Bébé, ou le Nain du roi Stanislas, historical comedy in 1 act, mingled with couplets
1837: La Dot de Cécile, comédie en vaudeville in 2 acts, with Gabriel de Lurieu and Emmanuel Théaulon
1837: Un colonel d'autrefois, comédie en vaudeville in 1 act, with Mélesville and de Lurieu
1837: L'Oncle d'Afrique, vaudeville in 1 act, with Veyrat
1838: Un trait de Joseph II, ou Pour ma mère, historical comedy in 1 act, mingled with couplets
1838: Les Commères de Bercy, vaudeville in 1 act, with Veyrat
1838: Les Filles savantes, comédie en vaudeville in 1 act
1838: Un premier bal, sketch in 1 act, mingled with couplets
1839: Les Belles Femmes de Paris, comédie en vaudeville in 1 act, with Eugène Vanel
1840: À la vie, à la mort !, comédie en vaudeville in 1 act
1840: Jean-Bart, ou les Enfans d'un ami, comédie en vaudeville in 1 act
1840: Le Mari de la fauvette, opéra comique in 1 act, with Ferdinand de Villeneuve
1840: Les Marins d'eau douce, comédie en vaudeville in 1 act, with Veyrat and de Villeneuve
1842: Au Vert Galant !, comédie en vaudeville in 2 acts
1842: Les Physiologies, comédie en vaudeville in 1 act, with Veyrat
1845: Trois femmes, trois secrets, comédie en vaudeville in 1 act
1846: L'Inconnue de Ville-d'Avray, comédie en vaudeville in 1 act, with de Villeneuve
1847: L'Homme aux 160 millions, comédie en vaudeville in 2 acts, avec Veyrat and de Villeneuve
1849: Une femme exposée, comédie en vaudeville in 1 act, with Saint-Yves
1849: Mademoiselle Carillon, comédie en vaudeville in 1 act, with Saint-Yves, after Goethe
1852: Ça et là, (recueil d'articles)
1854: Un spahi, comédie en vaudeville in 1 act, with Louis Cordiez

Bibliography 
 Joseph Marie Quérard, Félix Bourquelot, Charles Louandre, La Littérature française contemporaine. XIXe, vol.3, 1848, p. 449
 Gustave Vapereau, Dictionnaire universel des contemporains, 1859, p. 19 
 Ludovic Lalanne, Dictionnaire historique de la France, 1872, p. 732

External links 
 Antoine-Marie Coupart on data.bnf.fr

19th-century French dramatists and playwrights
1813 births
Writers from Antwerp
1861 deaths